Peter Treacey   was a professional baseball player who played shortstop in Major League Baseball in two games for the 1876 New York Mutuals. He played college ball at Fordham University. His brother, Fred Treacey, also played for the 1876 Mutuals.

References

External links

1852 births
New York Mutuals players
Major League Baseball shortstops
19th-century baseball players
Fordham Rams baseball players
Baseball players from New York (state)
Year of death unknown
Alaskas players
Brooklyn Chelsea players